Garreth Carvell (born 21 April 1980) is an English former professional rugby league footballer who played as a  in the 1990s, 2000s and 2010s. He played at representative level for Great Britain, England and Wales.

Background
Carvell was born in Leeds, West Yorkshire, England.

Playing career
Carvell made his Super League début for Leeds in 1997's Super League II as a 16-year-old against the Sheffield Eagles on Friday 22 August 1997.  

After a successful loan spell at the newly formed Gateshead Thunder in 1999, he signed for Hull F.C. in 2000 where he developed into one of the top s in the country, helping Hull F.C. to win the 2005 Challenge Cup Final.  

In 2000, Carvell made his international début when he represented Wales in the 2000 Rugby League World Cup. Garreth represented Great Britain in 2006 in the 2006 Tri-Nations competition held in Australia. He also helped Hull F.C. reach the 2008 Challenge Cup Final.

After signing a deal that would keep Carvell at Hull F.C. for the next three years he made a controversial U-turn and made the move to Warrington after a fee was paid. Carvell played for Warrington in the 2009 challenge cup final victory over Huddersfield, 2010 Challenge Cup Final victory over Leeds. and the 2012 challenge cup final victory again over Leeds. He also featured in the 2012 and 2013 Grand final defeats.

Carvell won caps for Wales while at Leeds 2000(…2007?) 1(3?)-caps + 2-caps (interchange/substitute), and won caps for Great Britain while at Hull F.C. in 2006 against New Zealand (2 matches).

Carvell was named in the England training squad for the 2008 Rugby League World Cup.

Carvell played in the 2010 Challenge Cup Final victory over Leeds at Wembley Stadium.

Carvell was also named in England's 24-man 2011 Four Nations squad. He appeared off the bench against New Zealand at the KC Stadium, Hull, and in the final against Australia at Elland Road, Leeds. 

Carvell played in the 2012 Challenge Cup Final victory over Leeds at Wembley Stadium.

Carvell played in the 2013 Super League Grand Final defeat by Wigan at Old Trafford.

In September 2014, Carvell was again called up to play for Wales in the 2014 European Cup. This was the first time that Carvell played for Wales in 14 years. But, unfortunately, he had to withdraw before the tournament due to an injury but he didn't completely leave the side as he took up an assistant coaching role.

Midway through the 2013 season Bradford announced that they had signed Carvell for the 2014 and 2015 seasons by signing him on a two-year deal. Carvell featured in the pre-season game against Hull FC. However, in the week leading up to the first Super League game the Bradford club went into administration and Carvell made the switch to former club Hull F.C. on a one-year deal. 

He then moved to the Castleford Tigers before finishing his career with a brief spell at Featherstone Rovers in the Championship making his début for Featherstone Rovers on Sunday 26 April 2015.

References

External links
Player Profile at hullfc.com
Profile at leedsrugby 
Six new GB faces for Tri-Nations
BBC Article "Carvell signs new Hull contract"
Profile at warringtonwolves.org

1981 births
Living people
Castleford Tigers players
England national rugby league team players
English people of Welsh descent
English rugby league players
Featherstone Rovers players
Gateshead Thunder (1999) players
Great Britain national rugby league team players
Hull F.C. players
Leeds Rhinos players
Rugby league players from Leeds
Rugby league props
Rugby league second-rows
Wales national rugby league team players
Warrington Wolves players